St Mark's is a parish church in the Church of England in Washwood Heath, Birmingham.

History

Building of the church started in 1890. The church was extended in 1894 with the addition of two bays of the nave with north and south aisles. In 1898 to 1899 a further extension of the nave and aisles was undertaken and a baptistry and steeple were built. The church was consecrated in 1899.

A parish was formed in 1907 when land was taken out of St Saviour's Church, Saltley.

It is under the care of the Bishop of Ebbsfleet and follows the Anglo-Catholic tradition in its liturgy.

Organ

The church contained an organ by F.W. Ebrall. A specification of the organ can be found on the National Pipe Organ Register.

References

Church of England church buildings in Birmingham, West Midlands
19th-century Church of England church buildings
Anglo-Catholic church buildings in the West Midlands (county)
Washwood Heath